Uigshader is a settlement on the Isle of Skye in Scotland.

The River Snizort flows north to the west of this settlement.

References

External links

Map of Uigshader

Populated places in the Isle of Skye